The National Basketball Association (NBA) holds an annual draft where teams select eligible players to join the league. While most NBA players are drafted, undrafted players occasionally earn roster spots as well. Sometimes, they even outperform more celebrated draft picks. The number of rounds in the draft has evolved since the first one in 1947. The 1960 and 1968 drafts were 21 rounds, before settling at 10 rounds by 1974 (in 1977, however, the draft was held in eight); it was reduced to seven rounds in 1985. After negotiations with the National Basketball Players Association, the draft has been two rounds since 1989, leaving undrafted players free to negotiate with any team.

Unlike with American football in the National Football League (NFL), undrafted players are less likely to become recognizable stars in the NBA. Only one modern-day undrafted player has been elected to the Naismith Memorial Basketball Hall of Fame—Ben Wallace in 2021. The first undrafted player to be voted an NBA All-Star starter in 2003, Wallace played the most career games of any undrafted player with 1,088 games played in 15 seasons, won an NBA championship, was a four-time All-Star, and was a four-time winner of the NBA Defensive Player of the Year Award.

Other undrafted players have made significant contributions. John Starks was the first undrafted player in the modern era to become an All-Star in 1994.  Udonis Haslem became the first undrafted player to lead a franchise (Miami) in career rebounds in 2012, and he was a member of each of the Heat's three championship teams. Mike James from the 1998 draft was the first undrafted player to average 20 points in a season (20.3) in 2006. Jorge Garbajosa was the first to be named All-Rookie First Team in 2007. Undrafted in the 2016 draft, the Toronto Raptors Fred VanVleet holds the single-game scoring record for an undrafted player with 54 points on February 2, 2021. Troy Hudson, who enjoyed an 11-year NBA career after being passed over in the 1997 draft, alluded to his rise in his 2007 album Undrafted.

List of undrafted players
The following players were undrafted in the specified year, but later played in at least one official regular season or playoff game in their career.

Professional players before/around the BAA's debut
The following players had previously played professional basketball before or around the inception of the Basketball Association of America (now NBA) but had played for the BAA/NBA at least once afterward.

Notes

References

Undrafted players
Undrafted players